is an album by Japanese rock band Ogre You Asshole, released on September 19, 2012. It was their third album on a major label and peaked at number 47 on the Oricon album chart. The band toured Japan in October and November in support of the album.

Track listing

References

External links
 Ogre You Asshole 100-nengo Interview, Natalie (in Japanese)
 Interview with Ogre You Asshole, Ele-King (in Japanese)

2012 albums
Ogre You Asshole albums